{{DISPLAYTITLE:C19H23N3O2}}
The molecular formula C19H23N3O2 (molar mass : 325.41 g/mol) may refer to:

 ABT-670, a potent, orally bioavailable dopamine agonist
 Ergometrine, a primary ergot and morning glory alkaloid
 Ergometrinine, an ergot alkaloid

Molecular formulas